Richard Lang is the Chairman, co-founder, and CEO (Chief Executive Officer) of Democrasoft, Inc.

Biography
Lang is a pioneer in the technology industry, having been the co-inventor of the world's first, patented, dual-deck VCR (videocassette recorder) in 1983, and co-founder of his first public company, Go-Video, Inc. In 1987, Lang invented (and later patented) a solution for efficiently delivering video and audio programs over electronic networks, in "burst" mode, which created a foundation for today's video-on-demand and audio-on-demand systems. In 1990, he co-founded Explore Technology, which later became burst.com, to develop and license this technology. Beginning in 2005, Burst licensed "burst" mode media delivery and network optimization technology to Microsoft, Apple and other preeminent companies in the industry. It eventually sold most of the remaining legacy patents in late 2010 and early 2011. Lang is also the author of a family of new intellectual property (IP) which addresses online collaboration methods and designs. 

Lang is the author of Virtual Country - Strategy for 21st Century Democracy.

Lang resides in the San Francisco North Bay Area with his family and, in his spare time, is a composer and musician.

References

External links
Richard Lang's Linkedin Profile
Richard Lang on MSNBC’s Dylan Ratigan Show
Richard Lang - Harnessing the Wisdom of the Crowd
Richard Lang - New Community Metrics

American technology chief executives
Technology evangelists
People in educational technology
Living people
Year of birth missing (living people)